Khairang may refer to:

Khairang, Kosi, Nepal
Khairang, Narayani, Nepal